Sekolah Berasrama Penuh Integrasi Selandar (abbreviated SBPI Selandar) is a boarding school located in Selandar, Malacca. It is one of the two Fully Residential Schools (SBP) in the state and one of 12 such schools in Malaysia. The school was established on 1 August 2003 when 84 first generation Form 1 students registered themselves at SISMe based on their excellence in the UPSR examination.

References

External links
 

Educational institutions established in 2003
Jasin District
2003 establishments in Malaysia
Co-educational boarding schools
Islamic schools in Malaysia